Goshainganj, also known as Gosainganj, is a town and nagar panchayat in the Faizabad district (officially Ayodhya district) of the Indian state of Uttar Pradesh. Located 32 km from the district headquarters Ayodhya, Goshainganj has one of the oldest markets of the district.

History
A local Baruwar  Taluqdar named Rai Ahankaari Singh (अहंकारी राय), gave the glebe land for the current market to a saint named Mahant Inccha Gosai(इच्छा गोसांई), on whose name, the market and later the town came to be known as Gosainganj.

Geography
It has an average elevation of 97m.

Demographics

As of 2011 Indian Census, Goshainganj nagar panchayat had a total population of 12,931, of which 6,702 were males and 6,229 were females. Population within the age group of 0 to 6 years was 1,585. The total number of literates in Goshainganj was 9,512, which constituted 73.6% of the population with male literacy of 77.6% and female literacy of 69.2%. The effective literacy rate of 7+ population of Goshainganj was 83.8%, of which male literacy rate was 88.6% and female literacy rate was 78.7%. The Scheduled Caste population was 1,187. Goshainganj had 2121 households in 2011.

Governance and politics
Goshainganj is a part of Goshainganj Vidhan Sabha constituency and Ambedkar Nagar Lok Sabha constituency. 

There is a police station in Goshainganj.

Transport

Roadways

Goshainganj is situated along Nawab Yusuf Road (Faizabad to Jaunpur road) and is well connected to other towns and cities.

Railways

Goshainganj Railway Station is the nearest railway station situated within the town.

Air 
Ayodhya Airport is the nearest airport in Ayodhya, Uttar Pradesh.

Neighbouring cities, towns and markets
 Ayodhya
 Akbarpur 
 Faizabad
 Jalalpur 
 Maya Bazar 
 Katehri
 Rajesultanpur
 Tanda
 Bandanpur

See also
 Akbarpur Airport
 Awadh

References

Cities and towns in Faizabad district